Alan Paul Benes (born January 21, 1972) is an American former professional baseball pitcher. He played in Major League Baseball from 1995 to 2003 for the St. Louis Cardinals, Chicago Cubs and Texas Rangers.

Amateur career
Benes attended Lake Forest High School in Illinois and Creighton University, where he was part of Creighton's NCAA College World Series appearance (1991). In 1991, he played collegiate summer baseball in the Cape Cod Baseball League for the Yarmouth-Dennis Red Sox and was named a league all-star. He was selected by the St. Louis Cardinals in the first round of the 1993 MLB Draft.

Professional career
He began his major league career in 1995, pitching in three games for the Cardinals. His performance during the 1996 season helped the Cardinals reach the playoffs for the first time since 1987. During the 1996 post-season, Alan posted an 0–1 record with a 2.84 ERA.

In 1997, batters hit only .219 against him, and Benes had 160 strikeouts in 161.2 innings.  His 2.89 ERA would have placed him tied for the sixth-best ERA than year, but he fell just  of an inning short of the 162 required innings when he had a shoulder injury that ended his season in late July.  At the time of this injury he ranked third in the league in strikeouts.

From  through , he pitched a combined 123 innings with St. Louis Cardinals, Chicago Cubs and Texas Rangers. After various stints in the minor leagues following the 2003 season, Alan retired before the  season and is currently serving as an instructor to the St. Louis Cardinals.

Personal
Benes is the younger brother and former teammate of former major league pitcher Andy Benes, the older brother of former minor league pitcher Adam Benes, and the uncle of former minor league pitcher Drew Benes.

References

External links

1972 births
Living people
Major League Baseball pitchers
Baseball players from Indiana
St. Louis Cardinals players
Chicago Cubs players
Texas Rangers players
St. Louis Cardinals scouts
Sportspeople from Evansville, Indiana
Creighton Bluejays baseball players
Lake Forest High School (Illinois) alumni
Yarmouth–Dennis Red Sox players
Arkansas Travelers players
Glens Falls Redbirds players
Iowa Cubs players
Louisville Redbirds players
Memphis Redbirds players
Potomac Cannons players
Savannah Cardinals players
Springfield Cardinals players
St. Petersburg Cardinals players
Anchorage Glacier Pilots players